Mohammad Hussain Talat (Punjabi and ; born 12 February 1996) is a Pakistani cricketer. He made his international debut for the Pakistan cricket team in April 2018. Domestically, he plays for Lahore Qalandars in the Pakistan Super League (PSL).

Domestic career
He made his PSL debut vs Quetta Gladiators in which he scored a valuable fifty for his team and helped Islamabad United to win the game for 1 run. In April 2018, he was named in Federal Areas' squad for the 2018 Pakistan Cup. He was named the man of the match in the final of the tournament. On 3 June 2018, he was selected to play for the Toronto Nationals in the players' draft for the inaugural edition of the Global T20 Canada tournament.

In September 2019, he was named in Balochistan's squad for the 2019–20 Quaid-e-Azam Trophy tournament. In August 2020, he was named in Southern Punjab's squad for the 2020–21 domestic season. In October 2020, in the 2020–21 Quaid-e-Azam Trophy, Talat scored his maiden double century in first-class cricket, with 253 runs.

He joined Rawalakot Hawks in the first edition of the Kashmir Premier League. He was man of the match in 2021 Kashmir Premier League.

International career
In March 2018, he was named in Pakistan's Twenty20 International (T20I) squad for their series against the West Indies. He made his T20I debut for Pakistan against the West Indies on 1 April 2018 where he was named the man of the match.

In August 2018, he was one of thirty-three players to be awarded a central contract for the 2018–19 season by the Pakistan Cricket Board (PCB). In December 2018, he was named in Pakistan's team for the 2018 ACC Emerging Teams Asia Cup. The following month, he was named in Pakistan's One Day International (ODI) squad for their series against South Africa. He made his ODI debut for Pakistan against South Africa on 22 January 2019. In November 2020, he was named in Pakistan's 35-man squad for their tour to New Zealand.

References

External links
 

1996 births
Living people
Punjabi people
Cricketers from Lahore
Pakistani cricketers
Pakistan One Day International cricketers
Pakistan Twenty20 International cricketers
Zarai Taraqiati Bank Limited cricketers
Sui Northern Gas Pipelines Limited cricketers
Lahore Eagles cricketers
Lahore Whites cricketers
Federally Administered Tribal Areas cricketers
Islamabad United cricketers
Federal Areas cricketers
Lahore Blues cricketers
Cape Town Blitz cricketers
Punjab (Pakistan) cricketers
Balochistan cricketers
Southern Punjab cricketers
Central Punjab cricketers
Peshawar Zalmi cricketers